Rubus nepalensis, the Himalayan creeping bramble or Nepalese raspberry, is a species of evergreen raspberry endemic to Nepal and Himalayan India. It grows to about 1m in diameter, with height up to 20 cm. The fruit is small, edible, and slightly sour.

About
Rubus nepalensis is a plant which is native to the country of Nepal. It comes from the plant family Rosaceae. It is a shrub that has many stems, and it is known for growing widely and covering a lot of ground. It spreads wherever it grows and takes over the area in which it is located. This plant is an evergreen, which means it will remain green throughout the whole year. It does not grow very high; the average height it will grow to is ten inches, and its spread would be about three feet. It has a Hardiness Zone of about 8a, which means that it can grow in, and withstand, an area with a minimum temperature of −12.2 °C to −9.4 °C. So, compared to many plants, it needs a relatively warm temperature. The flowers on this particular plant are a hermaphrodite, meaning it has both female and male flowers. This plant can be grown almost anywhere in Nepal, as it will grow in a variety of soils, including soils which contain clay or sand. It prefers soil that is drained, in other words, soil that is not too wet. This is an ideal plant for farmers to cultivate in Nepal, as the topography there is mountainous. If the berry was planted on the mountainsides, any excess water would naturally drain downward. This plant can either grow in little shade, or in no shade at all. This plant does not need a lot of care to grow well and produce a great output; it can do so with little human intervention.

However, this plant cannot grow in acidic soils. It requires a neutral pH level. As previously mentioned, it requires soil that is drained. The soil can be moist, but if there was to be a lot of rainfall and the soil were to become saturated, that would be bad for the plant. This plant is not drought tolerant, thus requiring a constant supply of water. Although this plant can grow with no shade, it does not do well when it is too hot, or if there is direct sunlight for extended periods of time. This plant is also known to be attacked by honey fungus. Honey fungus takes over the plant and eventually kills it. So farmers would need to ensure that this does not happen.

Impact on the environment
This plant is very environmentally sustainable. Farmers only need to purchase seeds for the initial planting. Seeds can then be harvested from the plant the next year, and planted. So there is only a start-up cost, because after the initial time, the plant is sustainable. Nepal is a mountainous country, and if this plant is grown on the mountains, it is vital to ensure that erosion does not occur. This plant itself would only minimally contribute to erosion as taking nutrients out of the soil exacerbates erosion, but the farming practices such as cutting down trees to clear land would contribute to soil erosion. A study found that using simple, inexpensive matter such as mulch, manure, and cover crop on the soil would help prevent erosion, and this manure could also be used as a natural fertilizer for the plant. This plant would also not require much, if any, pesticides or herbicides, as it is only really susceptible to honey fungus, as previously mentioned. The cultivation of this plant does not require ploughing or any work done by animals, which is expensive. The initial seeding is done by simply placing the seed in a hole, and after that it requires only occasional weeding and watering. For all these reasons, this plant is very cost efficient for poorer farmers.

The impact which this plant has on local biodiversity is very positive. It is a plant that is native to Nepal, thus native to the local ecosystem. It is preserving this ecosystem, as a foreign species is not being introduced, but something that is natural to the area is being cultivated. This plant also contributes to biodiversity as it gives nutrition to insects that pollinate it (the flowers are hermaphrodite, but require pollination through insects). Since this plant is indigenous to the country, it would not become an invasive species. Sometimes, however, it can spread and takeover a lot of ground cover. Then it must be cut back in order not to compete with other crops or plants.

Impact on local socioeconomic system
The impact this plant has on Nepalese women and children is also very positive. It is not difficult to cultivate this plant, plus it does not require much human intervention, only periodical weeding, or cutting it back, as it grows naturally. So it can be cultivated without a lot of hard labour. This allows any women who may be growing it to take care of other household matters, such as raising the children. It is also nutritious for children as it contains high volumes of vitamin C, which is needed for growing bodies.

If this crop were to become an export, one of the economic benefits would be that it would help to generate a stable income for farmers and their families, which then could help them to improve their farming practices, and raise their standards of living. It would allow them to eventually expand their farming practices, if the demand required it. It would also help to develop Nepal’s system of commerce, as people would be required to grade and pack the berries, and to transport and export them. It would not be a difficult task to begin a business with this plant. As mentioned earlier, seeds are usually inexpensive, and once the first seed is planted, the subsequent plant produces seeds that can be used for more plants, at no cost. Farmers can share seeds with each other, or simply buy them from a market. Since seeds are not usually expensive, the start-up costs would be low. This plant also does not require a tremendous amount of land to grow, in contrast to a crop such as maize, for example. Thus it is relatively easy and inexpensive to cultivate, as there is no need to buy large amounts of land, or equipment such as ploughs or animals.  The fruit of this plant is very versatile, as it can be used in a wide variety of products, such as smoothie additives, jams, or dried fruit. So there would be a wide market to which these farmers can sell.

Synonyms
 Rubus barbatus Edgew.
 Rubus nutans non Vest.
 Rubus nutantiflorus Hara.

References

 GBIF entry
 
 
 Beautiful Edible Gardens entry
 Meth. Sp.-Beschr. Rubus 125. 1879.
 Hara, H. et al. 1978–1982. An enumeration of the flowering plants of Nepal.

nepalensis
Flora of West Himalaya
Flora of Nepal
Flora of East Himalaya
Plants described in 1879